Tyvan is an unincorporated community in the Rural Municipality of Wellington No. 97, Saskatchewan, Canada. It is located on Highway 33, approximately 79 km southeast of the City of Regina. It previously held the status of a village until July 1, 1936.

See also 
 List of communities in Saskatchewan

References 

Former villages in Saskatchewan
Unincorporated communities in Saskatchewan
Wellington No. 97, Saskatchewan
Populated places established in 1904
Division No. 2, Saskatchewan